Shicheng Town is a town located in the Miyun District of Beijing, China. It shares border with Changshaoying Manchu Ethnic Township and Fengjiayu Town to its north, Bulaotun and Xiwengzhuang Towns to its east, Xitiangezhuang and Huaibei Towns to its south, as well as Liulimiao and Tanghekou Towns to its west. As of 2020, its population was 4,014.

The town was named after Shicheng Village, which hosts the town's government. Its name literally means "Stone City".

Geography 
Shicheng Town is bounded by Mount Yunmeng to the west and Miyun Reservoir to the east. Several waterways like Bai and Duijia Rivers flows eastward through the town.

In terms of transportation, Shicheng Town is connected to the Miguan and Liuxin Roads.

History

Administrative divisions 
In 2021, Shicheng Town was composed of 16 subdivisions, consisting of 1 community and 15 villages. They are listed as follows:

Gallery

See also 
 List of township-level divisions of Beijing

References

Miyun District
Towns in Beijing